The 2016–17 Florida State Seminoles women's basketball team, variously Florida State or FSU, represents Florida State University during the 2016–17 NCAA Division I basketball season. Florida State competes in Division I of the National Collegiate Athletic Association (NCAA). The Seminoles are led by head coach Sue Semrau, in her twentieth year, and play their home games at the Donald L. Tucker Center on the university's Tallahassee, Florida campus. They are members of the Atlantic Coast Conference.

Florida State finished the previous season with a 25–8 record. The Seminoles reached the sweet sixteen of the NCAA tournament and center Adut Bulgak went on to be drafted in the first round of the WNBA draft. Prior to the start of the season, Florida State was picked to finish third in the ACC while Leticia Romero and Shakayla Thomas were named to the preseason All-ACC team.

The Seminoles achieved their best start in school history, reaching twenty wins faster than any other FSU team. The seniors - Leticia Romero, Brittany Brown, Ivey Slaughter, and Kai James - became the winningest class in program history. Leticia Romero and Kai James went on to be selected in the WNBA draft.

Florida State finished second in the ACC but was eliminated in the quarterfinals of the ACC tournament. The Seminoles received an at-large bid to the NCAA tournament as a three-seed, their fifth consecutive tournament appearance, reaching the Elite Eight for just the third time in school history.

Roster

Depth chart

Rankings

Schedule

|-
!colspan=12 style="background:#; color:white;"| Exhibition

|-
!colspan=12 style="background:#; color:white;"| Regular season

|-
!colspan=12 style="background:#; color:white;"| ACC Women's tournament

|-
!colspan=12 style="background:#; color:white;"| NCAA Women's tournament

^Denotes the largest crowd in program history

Awards
 Naismith Coach of the Year Award semifinalist
Sue Semrau

Watchlists
Naismith Trophy
Leticia Romero
Shakayla Thomas

Wade Trophy
Leticia Romero
Shakayla Thomas

Wooden Award
Leticia Romero

Honors

All-ACC

All-Americans

WNBA draft
Two players were selected in the 2017 WNBA draft, marking the third time in school history that multiple players were selected.

References

External links
 Official Team Website

Florida State Seminoles women's basketball
Florida State
Florida State
Florida State Seminoles women's basketball seasons